Jorge Valente Gurgel (born January 25, 1977) is a retired Brazilian mixed martial artist who competed in the Lightweight division. A professional competitor from 2002 to 2014, Gurgel is best known as a contestant on The Ultimate Fighter 2 and for his career with the Ultimate Fighting Championship and Strikeforce.

Background
Gurgel is originally from Fortaleza, Brazil, where he earned a black belt in Brazilian jiu-jitsu under Marcus Aurélio. Gurgel immigrated to the United States as an exchange student in high school. Remaining to attend Wright State University he soon became an American citizen. While in school, Gurgel worked full-time teaching Brazilian jiu-jitsu evenings, waiting and busing tables late at night/early afternoons, and going to class in the morning. Since college, Gurgel has been training and teaching full-time.

Mixed martial arts career

Ultimate Fighting Championship
Gurgel starred in the second season of The Ultimate Fighter television series and was eliminated from the show in the fifth episode due to a loss to Jason Von Flue via unanimous decision, but showed tremendous heart by fighting with a blown ACL.

Gurgel's match with Diego Saraiva at UFC 73 was designated as the "Fight of the Night" by the UFC. In the contest, Gurgel defeated Saraiva by unanimous decision, even though he was badly injured during the fight. He was hospitalized afterward, due to a broken jaw and the presence of blood in his urine.

After his loss to Aaron Riley, Gurgel was released from the UFC. Gurgel was heavily criticized throughout his seven-fight run in the UFC for not displaying Brazilian jiu-jitsu skills in his fights. A third degree Brazilian jiu-jitsu black belt, the 35-year-old has generally elected to slug it out on his feet.

Strikeforce
Gurgel made his Strikeforce debut on June 19, 2009, defeating Conor Heun via unanimous decision.

Gurgel faced Billy Evangelista on November 6, 2009 at Strikeforce Challengers: Gurgel vs. Evangelista losing via unanimous decision.

Gurgel faced former EliteXC Lightweight Champion K. J. Noons at Strikeforce: Houston and lost by knockout 19 seconds into the second round. There was controversy surrounding this fight due to an apparent late punch by Noons at the end of the first round that dropped and stunned Gurgel and an illegal knee by Noons during the barrage of strikes prior to the referee stoppage.

Gurgel submitted Billy Vaughan in just 44 seconds via guillotine choke at Strikeforce: Feijao vs. Henderson on March 5, 2011.

Gurgel headlined Strikeforce Challengers 18 on August 12, 2011, against fellow Ultimate Fighter alumni Joe Duarte Gurgel lost by a unanimous decision.

Gurgel faced Adriano Martins at Strikeforce: Marquardt vs. Saffiedine on January 12, 2013, he lost via unanimous decision.

Titan Fighting Championship
Gurgel fought former UFC fighter Mike Ricci at Titan FC 27 on February 28, 2014. He lost by first-round TKO. Gurgel has now lost 7 of his last 9 fights.

On September 16, 2014, Gurgel announced his retirement from MMA competition.

Coaching
Gurgel owns the JG MMA and Fitness Academy in Cincinnati, Ohio, Gurgel has trained known fighters such as Rich Franklin, Justin Edwards, Zoila Frausto, Dustin Hazelett, Jason Butcher, and Sean Salmon.Gurgel also trained know members of the soriano crime family including Levani Testaverde who had a MMA record of 10-0.Due to a horrifying motercyle crash that almost took his life was forced to retire due to vision lost hearing impair and loss of memory.

Personal life 
Gurgel married female MMA fighter Zoila Frausto on February 19, 2011. The two have since separated.

Championships and accomplishments 
 Ultimate Fighting Championship
 Fight of the Night (Two times)
 Absolute Combat Challenge
 ACC Lightweight Championship (One time)

Brazilian jiu-jitsu 
 NAGA SuperFight Champion
 Six-time Brazilian State Champion
Levani Testaverde. Fight of the night. 30 second knockout

Mixed martial arts record 

|-
| Loss
| align=center| 14–10
| Mike Ricci
| TKO (punches and elbows)
| Titan Fighting Championship 27
| 
| align=center| 1
| align=center| 3:57
| Kansas City, Kansas, United States
| 
|-
| Loss
| align=center| 14–9
| Adriano Martins
| Decision (unanimous)
| Strikeforce: Marquardt vs. Saffiedine
| 
| align=center| 3
| align=center| 5:00
| Oklahoma City, Oklahoma, United States
| 
|-
| Loss
| align=center| 14–8
| Joe Duarte
| Decision (unanimous)
| Strikeforce Challengers: Gurgel vs. Duarte
| 
| align=center| 3
| align=center| 5:00
| Las Vegas, Nevada, United States
| 
|-
| Win
| align=center| 14–7
| Billy Vaughan
| Submission (guillotine choke)
| Strikeforce: Feijao vs. Henderson
| 
| align=center| 1
| align=center| 0:44
| Columbus, Ohio, United States
| 
|-
| Loss
| align=center| 13–7
| K. J. Noons
| KO (punches)
| Strikeforce: Houston
| 
| align=center| 2
| align=center| 0:19
| Houston, Texas, United States
| 
|-
| Loss
| align=center| 13–6
| Billy Evangelista
| Decision (unanimous)
| Strikeforce Challengers: Gurgel vs. Evangelista
| 
| align=center| 3
| align=center| 5:00
| Fresno, California, United States
| 
|-
| Win
| align=center| 13–5
| Conor Heun
| Decision (unanimous)
| Strikeforce Challengers: Villasenor vs. Cyborg
| 
| align=center| 3
| align=center| 5:00
| Kent, Washington, United States
| 
|-
| Loss
| align=center| 12–5
| Aaron Riley
| Decision (unanimous)
| UFC 91
| 
| align=center| 3
| align=center| 5:00
| Las Vegas, Nevada, United States
| 
|-
|  Loss
| align=center| 12–4
| Cole Miller
| Submission (triangle choke)
| UFC 86
| 
| align=center| 3
| align=center| 4:48
| Las Vegas, Nevada, United States
| 
|-
| Win
| align=center| 12–3
| John Halverson
| Decision (unanimous)
| UFC 82
| 
| align=center| 3
| align=center| 5:00
| Columbus, Ohio, United States
| 
|-
| Loss
| align=center| 11–3
| Alvin Robinson
| Decision (unanimous)
| UFC 77
| 
| align=center| 3
| align=center| 5:00
| Cincinnati, Ohio, United States
| 
|-
| Win
| align=center| 11–2
| Diego Saraiva
| Decision (unanimous)
| UFC 73
| 
| align=center| 3
| align=center| 5:00
| Sacramento, California, United States
| 
|-
| Win
| align=center| 10–2
| Danny Abbadi
| Decision (split)
| UFC 63: Hughes vs. Penn
| 
| align=center| 3
| align=center| 5:00
| Anaheim, California, United States
| 
|-
| Loss
| align=center| 9–2
| Mark Hominick
| Decision (unanimous)
| UFC Fight Night 5
| 
| align=center| 3
| align=center| 5:00
| Las Vegas, Nevada, United States
| 
|-
| Win
| align=center| 9–1
| Jason Ireland
| Submission (guillotine choke)
| KOTC 48: Payback
| 
| align=center| 3
| align=center| 2:25
| Cleveland, Ohio, United States
| 
|-
| Win
| align=center| 8–1
| Joe Jordan
| Submission (guillotine choke)
| Extreme Challenge 56
| 
| align=center| 1
| align=center| 1:55
| Medina, Minnesota, United States
| 
|-
| Win
| align=center| 7–1
| Gin Minajev
| Submission (guillotine choke)
| Extreme Challenge 56
| 
| align=center| 3
| align=center| 1:00
| Medina, Minnesota, United States
| 
|-
| Win
| align=center| 6–1
| Steve Kinnison
| Submission (guillotine choke)
| Freestyle Fighting Championships 8
| 
| align=center| 2
| align=center| 1:08
| Biloxi, Mississippi, United States
| 
|-
| Loss
| align=center| 5–1
| Masakazu Imanari
| Submission (heel hook)
| ZST: Grand Prix Opening Round
| 
| align=center| 1
| align=center| 0:32
| Tokyo, Japan
| 
|-
| Win
| align=center| 5–0
| Luke Spencer
| TKO (submission to punches)
| Absolute Combat Challenge 1
| 
| align=center| 3
| align=center| 1:55
| Canton, Ohio, United States
| 
|-
| Win
| align=center| 4–0
| Justin James
| Submission (armbar)
| VFC 4: Wildcard
| 
| align=center| 1
| align=center| 3:51
| Council Bluffs, Iowa, United States
| 
|-
| Win
| align=center| 3–0
| Gin Minajev
| Submission (guillotine choke)
| ICC 1: Retribution
| 
| align=center| 1
| align=center| 2:18
| Minneapolis, Minnesota, United States
| 
|-
| Win
| align=center| 2–0
| Calib Carr
| Submission (armbar)
| UW: St. Cloud 2
| 
| align=center| 1
| align=center| 0:18
| St. Cloud, Minnesota, United States
| 
|-
| Win
| align=center| 1–0
| Elvin Rodriguez
| Submission (armbar)
| UW: St. Cloud 2
| 
| align=center| 1
| align=center| 1:10
| St. Cloud, Minnesota, United States
|

See also
 List of Strikeforce alumni

References

External links 
 
 
 

American practitioners of Brazilian jiu-jitsu
American submission wrestlers
Brazilian practitioners of Brazilian jiu-jitsu
Brazilian submission wrestlers
American male mixed martial artists
Brazilian male mixed martial artists
Lightweight mixed martial artists
Mixed martial artists utilizing Brazilian jiu-jitsu
Living people
Sportspeople from Fortaleza
Brazilian emigrants to the United States
1977 births
People awarded a black belt in Brazilian jiu-jitsu
People from West Chester, Butler County, Ohio
Ultimate Fighting Championship male fighters